Lochmara Bay is a large bay in Queen Charlotte Sound / Tōtaranui, New Zealand, north of Urukakea / Picton Harbour. Until the 1860s it was officially known by its Te Reo Māori name Pehautangia.

Naming
Lochmara Bay takes its name from the pastoral run set up there by Courtney Kenny (1835–1905) in 1857 called Lochmara Run. The name is a thought to be a contraction of Loch na Mara, Scottish Gaelic for "loch of the sea".

Pehautangia means "place of roaring winds", a reference to the rough gales there.

History
In 1857 Courtney Kenny took out a depasturage license for all of the land between Tōrea Moua / Tōrea Bay and Ōnahau Bay in Queen Charlotte Sound / Tōtaranui, and between Te Mahia Bay and Portage in Kenepuru Sound. He named his pastoral run Lochmara Run, a name likely reflecting the Scottish and Irish connection of his wife Georgina Kenny (1835–1899). The Lochmara Run was initially about 2,000 hectares, but Kenny disposed of some in 1860, and converted around 1766 hectares to secure leasehold and freehold tenures. The 1880 block sheets show Kenny had cleared nearly half of his land of native bush, largely on the Lochmara Peninsula, Tōrea Moua / Tōrea Bay, and Double Cove, along with a swath from West Bay to Pukatea Bay. Kenny would go on to sell portions of the run to the Gullery family, with both families running sheep there for many years. Farming would come to an end on the remains of Lochmara Run by 1960, the land having been retaken by growth, making farming impossible. The land was subdivided for holiday housing in the 1960s, with some becoming the Lochmara Bay Scenic Reserve.

By 1917 Lochmara Bay / Pehautangia had been surveyed for townships. The majority of these lots never came to fruition, but some were developed by Marlborough families, who built houses and shacks there. After the Second World War more lots were subdivided and sold, some smaller than a hectare, and holiday housing became more popular along with the advent of improved roads and railways. In 1950 Lochmara Bay / Pehautangia had around 20 buildings, today it has roughly 250 homesteads.

East & West Bay
East Bay is located near the back of Lochmara Bay / Pehautangia on its eastern coast, while West Bay is located at the very back of the bay on its west coast.
East Bay & West Bay are named for their placement within Lochmara Bay / Pehautangia.

Hautehoro Point
Hautehoro Point sits on the western tip of Lochmara Bay / Pehautangia. Evidence of pit dwellings has been found here, suggesting it may have been used as a look-out or temporary dwelling.

Hautehoro can be split into 3 Te Reo Māori words, hau meaning "wind", te meaning "the", and horo meaning "break" (as a wave). Together hautehoro can be taken to mean "breaks the wind".

Nohokouau Point
Nohokouau Point sits on the eastern tip of Lochmara Bay / Pehautangia. Nohokouau can be translated as "to sit in sprinkling rain" or "sits in the mist".

Double Cove
Double Cove is located just outside of the eastern tip of Lochmara Bay / Pehautangia. Double Cove consists of 2 arms connected by a large cove, resembling a crab claw and giving the cove its name.

References

Bays of the Marlborough Region
Marlborough Sounds